James Lesley Bean, Jr. (December 15, 1932 – July 7, 2013) was an American businessman and politician. First winning a special election to succeed the outgoing David M. Smith in the Mississippi State Senate, he held the seat until he retired in 2000.

References

External links
 

Republican Party Mississippi state senators
1932 births
2013 deaths
20th-century American politicians